Moscow is the most populous city entirely within Europe, which hosts a minor population of ethnic minorities. The last census of 2010 reported 91.6% of the population was Russian.

Statistics
According to the 2010 Russian census, the top 20 ethnic groups were:

Largest minorities

Caucasians
The term Caucasus refers to a geographical area in the South of Russia and beyond. The Caucasus itself is diverse in terms of religion, language and culture.

In modern Russia, "Caucasians" (кавказцы, kavkaztsy) is an umbrella term for people from Armenia, Azerbaijan, Georgia and Northern Caucasus: Chechnya, Dagestan, Northern Ossetia, etc.

Armenians

 
The Armenian community of Moscow is one of the largest Armenian communities outside Armenia and one of the largest ethnic minorities of Moscow. In fact, some estimates even say that Moscow's Armenian population is equal to the population of Armenian capital Yerevan.

Jews
See also: History of Jews in Moscow

Jews were the largest non-Slavic ethnic group in Moscow before the collapse of the Soviet Union. Their number dwindled from 251,350 in 1970 to 53,145 in 2010. As most Russian Jews, Moscow Jews also migrated to Israel and the US.

Jews began to settle in Moscow around the 16th century. In the 19th as the Pale of Settlement  was instructed Jews were forbidden to settle in the city except for those who served in the army and after their end of service allowed to stay in the city. In 1848 there were 313 Jews in Moscow. In 1861, during the reign of Tsar Alexander II,  "useful Jews", such as scholars, merchants and artisans, were allowed to settle in Moscow and the number of Jews grew rapidly. In 1890 they numbered 40,000 men and the community built synagogues, schools and charities, many located in the Zarayadye quarter on the Moskva River and in Marina Rostcha neighborhood.

Nevertheless, after the assassination of Alexander II in 1881, a more radical policy was adopted towards the Jews. Jewish enrolment was restricted in schools and universities and in 1891 all Jews were forced out of Moscow.

After the Russian revolution in 1917 the pale of settlement was abolished and Jews were permitted to settle again in the city, many of whom were refugees. In the 1920s and 30s, the state promoted Yiddish-language arts and literature in an effort to influence its Jewish citizens. This resulted in a brief, rich cultural flourishing exemplified by the famed Moscow State Yiddish Theatre, whose inaugural production (1921) was a staging of Sholem Aleichem's stories with sets by Marc Chagall. In 1939 there were around 250,000 Jews in Moscow.

During WWII many Jews fled to inner parts of the Soviet Union but most of them returned at the end of the war and by 1970 there were again around 250,000 Jews in Moscow.

After the collapse of the Soviet Union, most of Jews emigrated from the city. In that period there was a revival of Jewish religious life, the leading bodies of Russia’s Jewish organizations were centered in Moscow and a number of synagogues re-opened. In 2010 there were 53,000 Russian Jews living in Moscow although it is estimated that there are around 150,000 people of Jewish origin in the city.

In addition, Moscow has one of the largest Israeli expatriate communities in the world, with 80,000 Israeli citizens living in the city as of 2014, almost all of them native Russian-speakers from Israel.

Yazidis

Yazidis in Russia

References

 
History of Moscow